Charles Andrew "Cy" Casper (May 28, 1912 – March 7, 1968) was an American football back for the Green Bay Packers, St. Louis Gunners, and Pittsburgh Pirates of the National Football League (NFL). He played college football for TCU.

Biography
Casper was born on May 28, 1912, in Memphis, Tennessee.

Career
Casper played with the Green Bay Packers and the St. Louis Gunners during the 1934 NFL season. The following season, he played with the Pittsburgh Steelers.

He played at the collegiate level at Texas Christian University.

See also
List of Green Bay Packers players
List of Pittsburgh Steelers players

References

1912 births
1968 deaths
Players of American football from Memphis, Tennessee
Green Bay Packers players
St. Louis Gunners players
Pittsburgh Pirates (football) players
Texas Christian University alumni
TCU Horned Frogs football players